Alexander Bastiaan Martin "Lex" Veldhuis (born 29 December 1983) is a Dutch professional poker player and Twitch and Youtube streamer from Vlissingen, Netherlands.

History
Veldhuis was formerly a StarCraft player. During an international event he met the French poker player Bertrand Grospellier. Grospellier inspired Veldhuis into playing online poker. In 2005, Grospellier deposited Veldhuis' first $10 at PokerStars.

Later he played live tournaments as well, but wasn't used to the slow pace. Online, he was used to playing fast with multiple tables at a time. He often complained about the pace of live poker. He met professional tennis player Raemon Sluiter, who advised him about sports mentality. Later Veldhuis helped and mentored Sluiter's girlfriend Fátima Moreira de Melo with her professional poker career.

Veldhuis was knocked out of the main event in the 2009 World Series of Poker on day 2 after finishing high in day 1 through bluffs with 84,000 chips. This eventually caught him and ended his main event competition without cashing.

Veldhuis is a member of Pokerstars Pro Team Online and streams high/mid stakes tournaments on PokerStars with average monthly buy-ins of US$40K on Twitch. He is considered a major poker personality in the industry. In 2020, Veldhuis finished 15th in the PokerStars SCOOP Main Event, winning $62,620. During this event, his stream was watched by a peak of 58,799 viewers, a record for poker streamers.

As of January 2021, his live poker winnings exceed US$600,000.

References

External links
 Lex Veldhuis Hendon Mob profile
 
 Lex Veldhuis Interview

1983 births
Living people
Dutch poker players
Sportspeople from Vlissingen
Twitch (service) streamers